The Women's 10 metre air pistol SH1 event at the 2012 Summer Paralympics took place on 31 August at the Royal Artillery Barracks in Woolwich.

The event consists of two rounds: a qualifier and a final. In the qualifier, each shooter fires 40 shots with an air pistol at 10 metres distance from the "standing" (interpreted to include seated in wheelchairs) position. Scores for each shot are in increments of 1, with a maximum score of 10.

The top 8 shooters in the qualifying round move on to the final round. There, they fire an additional 10 shots. These shots score in increments of .1, with a maximum score of 10.9. The total score from all 50 shots is used to determine final ranking.

Qualification round

Q Qualified for final

Final

References

Shooting at the 2012 Summer Paralympics
Para